Jørgen Olsen Øveraas (born 3 December 1989) is a Norwegian footballer who plays as a right-back.

He signed a contract with Stabæk in 2020. He previously played for Strindheim, Sandnes Ulf, Egersund and Ranheim. In 2022 and 2023, Øveraas played futsal at the highest level in Norway for Freidig Futsal.

Career statistics

Club

References

1989 births
Living people
Footballers from Trondheim
Norwegian footballers
Strindheim IL players
Ranheim Fotball players
Sandnes Ulf players
Egersunds IK players
Stabæk Fotball players
Eliteserien players
Norwegian First Division players
Norwegian Second Division players

Association football defenders